Mehtap Doğan-Sızmaz, née Sızmaz, (born November 16, 1978) is a Turkish long-distance runner, who specialized in the marathon.

She won the gold medal in the women's marathon at the 2001 Mediterranean Games held in Tunis, Tunisia. She set a women's course record on the way to victory at the 2009 Madrid Marathon. She made a strong start at the 2010 Düsseldorf Marathon in April, but ended up dropping out after leading the race early on.

Achievements

Personal bests 
Marathon - 2:31:13 (2006)

References

External links

1978 births
Living people
Turkish female long-distance runners
Beşiktaş J.K. athletes
Turkish female marathon runners
Athletes (track and field) at the 2001 Mediterranean Games
Mediterranean Games gold medalists for Turkey
Mediterranean Games medalists in athletics
20th-century Turkish sportswomen
21st-century Turkish sportswomen